"I Don't Remember Loving You" is a song written by Harlan Howard and Bobby Braddock, and recorded by American country music artist John Conlee.  It was released in October 1982 as the third single from the album Busted.  The song reached #10 on the Billboard Hot Country Singles & Tracks chart.

Content
The song is about a man driven insane by his lover's infidelities and unable to recognize her when she visits him in a psychiatric hospital.

Chart performance

References

1983 singles
1982 songs
John Conlee songs
Songs written by Harlan Howard
Songs written by Bobby Braddock
MCA Records singles